The John Harris Bridge is a steel girder multilane highway bridge that carries Interstate 83 and the Capital Beltway across the Susquehanna River at Harrisburg, Pennsylvania, connecting the East and West Shores of metropolitan Harrisburg. It is primarily used by commuters and local services, including the extensive local trucking industry, and also carries cross-river traffic to or from the counties of the lower Susquehanna valley. 

The bridge was named in honor of John Harris, Sr, an early 18th century trader and ferry operator who was among the earliest Europeans to settle in the area, and whose son laid out the city he named after his father. It is also known locally as the South Bridge, in reference to the older Walnut Street, Market Street, and Harvey Taylor bridges upstream, which were the primary local automobile crossings at the time of its construction.

A product of the post-World War II growth of the Harrisburg suburbs, the bridge officially opened on January 22, 1960, as part of the Harrisburg Expressway. On the east shore, Central Iron and Steel and parts of the Shipoke neighborhood, both dating from the 19th century, were demolished to accommodate the bridge and its exit ramps into the downtown.  

The bridge was widened to six lanes in 1982.  In 1997, the Expressway and bridge were designated as part of the Capital Beltway which loops the metropolitan area.  In 2015, as part of a nearby reconstruction project, a fourth northbound lane was opened, for a total of seven traffic lanes.

In 2020, the John Harris was one of nine bridges selected by the Pennsylvania Department of Transportation (PennDOT) for end-of-life replacement under its Pathways Major Bridge Public-Private Partnership (P3) Initiative.  Because P3 costs were to be paid in part by tolling, the Dauphin and Cumberland County governments, state legislators, and business groups came out against the P3 Initiative or making the John Harris a toll bridge. Lawsuits were filed against PennDOT, and in June 2022, Pennsylvania’s Commonwealth Court permanently blocked the P3 Initiative.  In July 2022 the state enacted Act 84, rescinding the bridge-tolling plan.

See also
 
 
 
 List of crossings of the Susquehanna River

References

Harris
Bridges over the Susquehanna River
Bridges completed in 1960
Road bridges in Pennsylvania
Interstate 83
Bridges on the Interstate Highway System